The Punjab budget 2019–20 is the provincial budget of Punjab, Pakistan for the fiscal year beginning from 1 July 2019 and ending on 30 June 2020.

It was presented by Provincial Finance Minister Hashim Jawan Bakht on 14 June 2019 at the Provincial Assembly of the Punjab with a total outlay of ₨. 3.2 tn.

References 

Pakistani budgets
federal budget
federal budget